Oberalm is a market town in the Hallein district in the Austrian state of Salzburg. It is the burial town of volksmusik singer Karl Moik, the longtime presenter of ORF Musikantenstadl.

See also
 Salzburgerland
 Salzburg

References

Cities and towns in Hallein District